Velbert-Rosenhügel station is located in the city of Velbert in the German state of North Rhine-Westphalia. It is on the Wuppertal-Vohwinkel–Essen-Überruhr line. It was built in 2003 and is classified by Deutsche Bahn as a category 6 station.

The station is served by Rhine-Ruhr S-Bahn line S 9 (Recklinghausen / Haltern – Gladbeck - Bottrop - Essen - Velbert - Wuppertal -Hagen ), operating every 30 minutes during the day.

It is also served by three bus routes operated by WSW mobil: 627 (at 60 minute intervals), 647 (at 20 minute intervals) and 649 (at 20 minute intervals).

Notes

Rhine-Ruhr S-Bahn stations
S9 (Rhine-Ruhr S-Bahn)
Railway stations in Germany opened in 2003
Buildings and structures in Mettmann (district)